The 7th Los Angeles Film Critics Association Awards, honoring the best filmmaking of 1980, were announced on 14 December 1981 and given on 13 January 1982.

Winners
Best Picture:
Atlantic City
Runner-up: Reds
Best Director:
Warren Beatty - Reds
Runner-up: Lawrence Kasdan – Body Heat
Best Actor:
Burt Lancaster – Atlantic City
Runner-up: Henry Fonda – On Golden Pond
Best Actress:
Meryl Streep – The French Lieutenant's Woman
Runner-up: Diane Keaton – Reds
Best Supporting Actor:
John Gielgud – Arthur
Runner-up: Jack Nicholson – Reds
Best Supporting Actress:
Maureen Stapleton – Reds
Runner-up: Melinda Dillon – Absence of Malice
Best Screenplay:
John Guare – Atlantic City
Runner-up: Warren Beatty and Trevor Griffiths – Reds
Best Cinematography:
Vittorio Storaro – Reds
Runner-up: Freddie Francis – The French Lieutenant's Woman
Best Music Score:
Randy Newman – Ragtime
Runner-up: Vangelis – Chariots of Fire
Best Foreign Film:
Pixote (Pixote: A Lei do Mais Fraco) • Brazil
Runner-up: Chariots of Fire • UK
Experimental/Independent Film/Video Award:
R. Bruce Elder – The Art of Worldly Wisdom 
New Generation Award:
John Guare
Career Achievement Award:
Barbara Stanwyck
Special Citation:
Kevin Brownlow – Napoléon

References

External links
7th Annual Los Angeles Film Critics Association Awards

1981
Los Angeles Film Critics Association Awards
Los Angeles Film Critics Association Awards
Los Angeles Film Critics Association Awards
Los Angeles Film Critics Association Awards